The City Centre Transit Terminal in Mississauga, Ontario, Canada is the main transit hub and bus station for MiWay, the city's public transit system.  The station is situated in Mississauga City Centre at the northwest corner of Square One Shopping Centre, and buses using the terminal display "Square One" on their destination signs.

Buses use the upper level, while access from the mall is on lower ground via crosswalk (no direct connection), where a taxi stand and kiss and ride are located. Services provided on the upper level of the building include ticket sales, information booth, and lost and found, while washroom facilities and MiWay transit police holding cells is located on the lower level. The terminal is accessible by both elevator and escalator.

GO Transit's regional Square One Bus Terminal is located directly north, across Rathburn Road, on Station Gate Road.

History
The terminal opened in November 1997, replacing an overcrowded loop on the southeast side of the mall. Seventy five percent of the cost of the $6.5 million project was covered by subsidies from the Ministry of Transportation of Ontario, with the balance of funds coming from the city's capital budget. Platforms were extended east along Rathburn Road in the mid to late 2000s.

In 2015, public washrooms were renovated.

In 2016, the bus terminal was closed except the building for repairs. Buses at that time had to be boarded along Rathburn Road.

Bus routes
Along with MiWay buses, the terminal is served by one Brampton Transit Züm bus rapid transit route. All routes are wheelchair-accessible.

MiWay

Brampton Transit

References

External links

City Centre Transit Terminal
Bus stations in Ontario
Mississauga Transitway
Buildings and structures in Mississauga
1997 establishments in Ontario
Transport infrastructure completed in 1997
Hurontario LRT